Kuhsarat Rural District is a rural district (dehestan) in the Central District of Minudasht County, Golestan Province, Iran. At the 2006 census, its population was 14,139, in 3,272 families.  The rural district has 18 villages.

References 

Rural Districts of Golestan Province
Minudasht County